Tatranská Lomnica railway station is a break-of-gauge junction station in the High Tatras. It serves the settlement of Tatranská Lomnica, in the Prešov Region, northeastern Slovakia.

Opened in 1895, the station is the eastern terminus of the Starý Smokovec—Tatranská Lomnica branch line operated by the metre gauge Tatra Electric Railway (TEŽ). It also forms the junction between that line and the standard gauge Poprad-Tatry–Tatranská Lomnica branch, which is a spur line from the Poprad-Tatry–Plaveč railway, another standard gauge branch line.

The station is currently owned by Železnice Slovenskej republiky (ŽSR); train services are operated by Železničná spoločnosť Slovensko (ZSSK).

Location

Tatranská Lomnica railway station is right in the heart of Tatranská Lomnica, which forms part of the town of Vysoké Tatry, a conglomerate of separate and different settlements (originally separate villages).

The only common feature of the Vysoké Tatry settlements is that they are the main tourist resorts in the Slovak High Tatras, connected through a common railway network, the TEŽ.

After the country's capital, Vysoké Tatry is Slovakia's major tourist destination.

History

Facilities
The station building is a single storey building with a gable end facing the main platform. It houses information and ticketing facilities, and a restaurant.

Train services
Tatranská Lomnica railway station is the junction of the following High Tatras railway lines:

 Line : Starý Smokovec–Tatranská Lomnica (TEŽ metre gauge)
 Line :Poprad-Tatry–Plaveč; Studený Potok–Tatranská Lomnica (standard gauge)

Interchange
The station offers interchange with local buses.

See also

History of rail transport in Slovakia
Rail transport in Slovakia

References

Notes

Books

External links

 Tatranská Lomnica railway station on vlaky.net 

High Tatras
Railway stations in Prešov Region
Railway stations opened in 1895
Railway stations in Slovakia opened in the 19th century